Viraj Mendis is a Sri Lankan national who claimed the right of sanctuary at the Church of the Ascension in Hulme, Manchester, England during the 1980s.

Mendis had arrived in the UK in October 1973 on a twelve-month student visa but overstayed his visa. He was an active supporter of the Tamils  and, in the UK, the Revolutionary Communist Group and claimed danger of death if he was sent back to Sri Lanka. Following a march to protest against his deportation on 20 December 1986 he ran into  the Church of the Ascension and claimed the right of sanctuary. He stayed in the church for the next two years with the help of the rector John Methuen. The church became the focus of the "Viraj Mendis Defence Campaign" against his deportation. In late 1988 his supporters were invited to address an assembly at Burnage High School, Pupils were encouraged to enlist the help of parents to his cause.  One parent took exception to this and contacted the Manchester Evening News, the story was then picked up on by The Daily Telegraph; shortly after Mendis was removed. On 18 January 1989 police raided the church and arrested Mendis, which led to a large demonstration and questions in the House of Commons.

He was deported back to Sri Lanka and his fears did not materialize. Mendis claimed his case had received so much publicity that the Sri Lankan government did not dare to harm him. Eight British activists accompanied him to Sri Lanka to offer protection. He was later granted asylum in Germany and became chairperson of the International Human Rights Association in Bremen (Internationaler Menschenrechtsverein Bremen) and worked defending refugees facing deportation, and on Tamil liberation. 

While in Sri Lanka, Mendis married his partner Karen Roberts, and has thus been able to return to the UK several times. In 2010 he was refused permission to enter for the funeral service of John Methuen.

In 2018 Mendis' organisation concluded a successful campaign to defend 13 activists, 12 of them Tamil, against charges of "fraud, false documentation, money laundering and extortion". In June of that year, the 13 were found not guilty by the Swiss Federal Criminal Court. The Sri Lankan Government subsequently listed him as a terrorist.

References

Living people
Right of asylum in the United Kingdom
People from Hulme
Sinhalese activists
Year of birth missing (living people)